Abrams Creek is a creek in Blount County, Tennessee.  Its headwaters are in Cades Cove, and it is a tributary of the Little Tennessee River. It is named after the Chilhowee Cherokee chief Old Abraham ("Abram").  Visitors swim and fish in the creek.  The creek was deliberately poisoned in 1957 to kill fish in potential competition with rainbow trout; many fish species were extirpated from the river and have never recovered.

Variant names
According to the Geographic Names Information System, it has also been known historically as:
Abrahams Creek
Abram Creek
Abram's Creek
Anthony Creek
Cove Creek
Green Creek

Course
Abrams Creek begins at the confluence of Anthony Creek and Left Prong Anthony Creek west of Cold Water Knob, in Blount County, Tennessee and then flows generally west to join the Little Tennessee River in Chilhowee Lake approximately five miles north of Calderwood.

Watershed
Abrams Creek drains  of area, receives about 62.7 in/year of precipitation, has a wetness index of 254.58, and is about 94% forested.

See also
List of rivers of Tennessee

References

Rivers of Tennessee
Rivers of Blount County, Tennessee